The Embassy of India in Belgrade is the diplomatic mission of India to Serbia. The ambassador is Sanjiv Kohli. India has not yet recognised the territory of Kosovo, and instead regards the territory to be "an integral part of Serbia" and serves its jurisdiction.

Activities
The embassy engages in various activities for locals, and also promotes doing business as well.

See also
 India–Serbia relations
 India–Kosovo relations
 India's reaction to the 2008 Kosovo declaration of independence
 Foreign relations of Kosovo
 Foreign relations of Serbia
 Foreign relations of India
 List of diplomatic missions in Serbia
 List of diplomatic missions of India

References

External links
 
 EEPCINDIA

Serbia
India
India–Serbia relations